Yolina is a genus of beetles in the family Dytiscidae, containing the following species:

 Yolina baerti Biström, 1983
 Yolina balfourbrownei Biström, 1988
 Yolina brincki (Omer-Cooper, 1965)
 Yolina chopardi (Guignot, 1950)
 Yolina elegantula (Boheman, 1848)
 Yolina inopinata (Omer-Cooper, 1955)
 Yolina insignis (Sharp, 1882)
 Yolina kongouensis Bilardo & Rocchi, 1999
 Yolina libera Biström, 1987
 Yolina royi Biström, 1983
 Yolina sima (Omer-Cooper, 1965)
 Yolina wewalkai Biström, 1983

References

Dytiscidae genera